Namrata Shrestha may refer to:
Namrata Shrestha, Nepalese actress
Namrata Shrestha (model), Nepalese model who was crowned Miss World Nepal 2020